Eilema amaura is a moth of the subfamily Arctiinae first described by Erich Martin Hering in 1932. It is found in the Democratic Republic of the Congo.

References

Moths described in 1932
amaura
Insects of the Democratic Republic of the Congo
Moths of Africa
Endemic fauna of the Democratic Republic of the Congo